(English: 'Nurses'), originally produced under the title  (English: 'Nurses Blue Code') is a Czech medical television series from Prima televize. It loosely follows the Modrý kód ('Blue Code') series. The plot of the series focuses on the nurses in the emergency department. It stars Sabina Laurinová, Natálie Halouzková, Jan Nedbal, Adéla Gondíková, Saša Rašilov, Marek Němec and others. The first episode aired on 29 August 2020.

It was followed by 1. mise.

Cast

Nurses
 Sabina Laurinová as Marie "Mery" Tomášková (née Černá)
 Adéla Gondíková as Michaela "Míša" Kratochvílová
 Natálie Halouzková asBc. Kateřina "Katka" Kinská
 Jan Nedbal as Lukáš Hartman
 Michaela Sejnová as Libuše "Libuna/Libuška" Volejníková
 Renata Prokopová as Šárka Pokorná

Other hospital employees
 Saša Rašilov as MUDr. Michal Tomášek
 Roman Zach as MUDr. Roman Nikolajev "Rasputin" Vilkin	
 Kristýna Frejová as MUDr. Ema Vlčková
 Ondřej Rychlý as MUDr. Prokop Hlinka
 David Gránský as MUDr. Matyáš "Maty" Bojan
 Sandra Nováková as MUDr. Alexandra "Saša" Růžičková
 Marek Němec as MUDr. David Hofbauer
 Igor Chmela as prim. MUDr. Viktor Žák
 Tomáš Měcháček as MUDr. Adam Brejcha

References

External links

2020 Czech television series debuts
Czech action television series
Czech drama television series
Czech medical television series
Prima televize original programming
Sequel television series
Czech television spin-offs